Noël Duval (24 December 1929, Le Chesnay – 12 December 2018, Paris) was a French archaeologist.

Biography 
In 1953 Duval started working as a researcher and for three consecutive years worked at the Roman Historical Institute. He was a member of French National Centre for Scientific Research, École du Louvre and worked at the University of Nantes, Lille and Fribourg in Switzerland. In 1960 he became interested in both Hispanic and Catalan archaeology and by 1976 he became a professor at Paris-Sorbonne University where he taught Late Antiquity and Byzantinian Art in Middle Ages. He worked there until 1992 and then became a member of Reial Acadèmia de Bones Lletres in Barcelona, Spain. Since 1990, he focused himself on Augustan History and by 1994 he was awarded an honorary doctorate from the University of Geneva. Later in his career he taught archaeology at the Autonomous University of Barcelona. Duval was elected as an emeritis professor fellow at the University of Paris in 2007.

Duval married historian Yvette Duval in 1954.

Honours and awards

Honours
 Knight of the Legion of Honour (France) 
 Officier of the National Order of Merit (France) 
 Commander of the Ordre des Palmes Académiques (France) 
 Gold Medal of the city of Split (Croatia) 
 Medal of the city of Sremska Mitrovica (Serbia)

Awards
 CNRS Silver Medal
 CNRS Bronze Medal
 Bronze and Silver Medals of the Académie d'architecture
 Prize of the Académie des Inscriptions et Belles-Lettres
 Frend Medal of Christian Archeology of the Society of Antiquaries of London

Acknowledgement
 Member of the Pontifical Academy of Archaeology
 Member of the Serbian Academy of Sciences and Arts
 Member of the Royal Academy of Sciences and Arts of Barcelona 
 Member of the German Archaeological Institute
 Member of the Society of Antiquaries of London
 Associate Member of the British Academy

Honorary degrees
 1994 : University of Geneva
 2000 : Autonomous University of Barcelona

Main publications 
 Les églises africaines à deux absides, 2 vols, Rome, CEFR, 1971 and 1973
 Les ruines de Sufetula-Sbeitla (with F. Baratte), Tunis, éd. STD, 1973
 Haïdra, les ruines d'Ammaedara (with F. Baratte), Tunis, éd. STD, 1974
 Haïdra I. Les inscriptions chrétiennes d’Haïdra (with F. Prévot), Rome, CEFR, 1975 
 Catalogue des mosaïques romaines et paléochrétiennes du Musée du Louvre (with F. Baratte), Rome, CEFR, 1978 
 Sirmium VII et VIII (Direction with V. Popovic), Rome, CEFR, 1977 and 1978 
 Catalogue des mosaïques romaines et paléochrétiennes du Musée du Louvre (with F. Baratte), Paris, Réunions des musées nationaux, 1978
 Haïdra II, L’église I dite de Melléus [under the direction], Rome, CEFR, 1981
 Inventaire des basiliques chrétiennes d’Afrique du Nord : Inventaire des monuments de l'Algérie, 2 vols (with Isabelle Gui et Jean-Pierre Caillet), Paris, Collection des Études augustiniennes, 1992
 Salona I, recherches archéologiques franco-croates à Salone [under the direction], Rome, CEFR, 1994
Les premiers monuments chrétiens de la France, Paris, Éditions A et J Picard, 1995
Les premiers monuments chrétiens de la France II, Paris, Éditions A and J Picard, 1996
Salona II, Rome, CEFR, 1996
Les premiers monuments chrétiens de la France III, Paris, Éditions  A and J Picard, 1998
 Les mosaïques funéraires d'une église de Pupput (with Aïcha Ben Abed), Paris, CNRS, 1998
Salona III, Rome, CEFR, 2000
L’Historiae Augustae Colloquium I de la nouvelle série, (with G. Bonamente), Bari, Edipuglia, 2000
 Actes de la journée d'études sur les églises de Jordanie et leurs mosaïques [under the direction], Beirut, Institut français du Proche-Orient, 200313
 Haïdra IV, L’église de Candidus ou des martyrs de la persécution de Dioclétien (co-edition with F. Baratte), Rome, CEFR, 2010
 La nouvelle Carte des voies romaines de l’Est de l’Africa dans l’Antiquité Tardive d’après les travaux de P. Salama (Direction with Claude Lepelley and Jehan Desanges), Turnhout, Brepols, 2010
 Caričin Grad III. L’Acropole et ses monuments [under the direction], Rome, CEFR, 2010
 Salona IV : Recherches archéologiques franco-croates à Salone, Inscriptions de Salone chrétienne, IVe-VIIe siècles (vol. I et II), (with Emilio Marin, Jean-Pierre Caillet, Denis Feissel, Nancy Gauthier et Françoise Prévot), Rome, CEFR, 2010
 Basiliques chrétiennes d’Afrique du Nord. II, Monuments de la Tunisie (with François Baratte & Fathi Bejaoui), Bordeaux, Ausonius, 2015

References 

1929 births
2018 deaths
Academic staff of the Autonomous University of Barcelona
Academic staff of the University of Nantes
French scholars of Roman history
French archaeologists
French epigraphers
20th-century archaeologists
Officers of the Ordre national du Mérite
Commandeurs of the Ordre des Palmes Académiques
21st-century archaeologists
Members of the Serbian Academy of Sciences and Arts
Fellows of the Society of Antiquaries of London
Phoenician-punic archaeologists
Corresponding Fellows of the British Academy